Edward Michel Khayat (born September 14, 1935) is a thirty-five year National Football League veteran, ten years as a player (117 game total) and twenty-five as a coach. He was a starting defensive tackle for the victorious Philadelphia Eagles in the 1960 NFL Championship Game and later their head coach in 1971 and 1972. He has been inducted into six Halls of Fame. Currently he serves on the Former Players Board of Directors of the National Football League Players Association (NFLPA).

High school

Khayat attended Moss Point High School (Moss Point, Mississippi)  from 1949 to 1953, where he lettered in football twice, basketball three times, and baseball three times.

College

In 1953, Khayat attended Millsaps College, where he lettered in football and basketball. In 1954, he won the Mississippi Golden Gloves Heavyweight Championship (novice class).

Also in 1954, he won a scholarship to Perkinston Junior College (Mississippi Gulf Coast Community College), where he lettered in football and basketball. In 1976, he was inducted into the MGCCC Alumni Hall of Fame and in 2003 into the MGCCC Athletic Hall of Fame.

In 1955, he was awarded a scholarship to Tulane University where he lettered in football twice and baseball once. He was elected to the All-Time Tulane Green Wave football team in 1979, the Tulane Green Wave football All-Century Team in 1993, and inducted into the Tulane Athletic Hall of Fame in 1981.

Professional
In 1957, he was signed as a free agent by the Washington Redskins. His playing career spanned ten years until his retirement after the 1966 season with the Boston Patriots. The bulk of his career was spent with the Philadelphia Eagles, where he was the starting defensive tackle for the 1960 World Championship team. In 2006, he was inducted into the Philadelphia Sports Hall of Fame as a member of the 1960 Eagles.

Coaching career

NFL
After his retirement from playing, Khayat began his twenty-five-year career in the National Football League as a coach. In 1967, he became the first defensive line coach for the expansion New Orleans Saints, where he coached future Hall of Famer Doug Atkins. In his next stop  with the Philadelphia Eagles (1971–1972), he was named Head Coach three games (after Jerry Williams was fired) into the season and rallied the team to a 6-4-1 finish. In an interesting sidelight, he imposed a draconian hair and dress code on the Eagles players during his stint with the Eagles — which led to widespread resentment, including linebacker Tim Rossovich demanding, and getting, a trade (to the then-San Diego Chargers).  In the run-up to the team's November 26, 1972 game against the New York Giants, Khayat "guaranteed" that the Eagles would win the game, despite the fact that the Eagles were a 14-point underdog — and after the Giants won the game 62-10, it was widely believed that this sealed his fate in Philadelphia (three weeks later, after a loss to the then-St. Louis Cardinals meant that the Eagles finished last in the NFC East, Khayat was fired the next day).

After that, during his stint as an assistant coach with the Atlanta Falcons (1975–1976), he coached another future Hall of Fame member, Claude Humphrey (who ironically went on to play for the Eagles). He was also the defensive line coach for the AFC East Champion Baltimore Colts (1977), the AFC Champion New England Patriots (1985) and the AFC East Champion New England Patriots (1986).

AFL
In 1991, Khayat added coaching in the Arena Football League to his résumé when he became the head coach of the New Orleans Night. In 1997, he took the helm of the Nashville Kats and led them to a 10–4 record. It was only the second time to date that an expansion team had hosted a play-off.  He was honored as Arena Football Coach of the Year for guiding the team to a division championship. He retired after the 2003 season as head coach of the Carolina Cobras.

Personal

Khayat's brother, Robert Khayat, is a former Pro Bowl kicker for the Washington Redskins.  He was the recipient of the NFL's Alumni Achievement Award, the National Football Foundation Distinguished American Award, and is presently the Chancellor Emeritus of the University of Mississippi. They were one of only a few sets of brothers to play on the same team at the same time, and they are both members of the Mississippi Sports Hall of Fame.

Khayat's son Bill Khayat is a former record-setting, Honorable Mention All-America tight end from Duke University, who played professionally and is a veteran collegiate and professional football coach.

In 1988, Khayat continued his long association with Special Olympics when he and former Philadelphia Eagles teammate George Tarasovic co-founded a celebrity golf tournament for the benefit of York County (PA) Special Olympics. Since its inception, the tournament, which was renamed in their honor in 2015, has raised hundreds of thousands of dollars for the benefit of the county's Special Olympics programs.

Honors and awards

Mississippi Sportsman of the Year 1971, All-Time Tulane Football Team 1979, Tulane Green Wave All-Century Team 1993, Pennsylvania Chiefs of Police President's Award 1996, Arena Football League Coach of the Year 1997

Hall of Fame inductions

MGCCC Alumni Hall of Fame 1976, Tulane Athletic Hall of Fame 1981, York Area Sports Hall of Fame 1992, MGCCC Athletic Hall of Fame 2003, Mississippi Sports Hall of Fame 2004, Philadelphia Sports Hall of Fame (as member of 1960 Philadelphia Eagles) 2006

See also
 List of American Football League players

References

1935 births
Living people
American football defensive linemen
Mississippi Gulf Coast Bulldogs football players
Tulane Green Wave football players
Washington Redskins players
Philadelphia Eagles players
Boston Patriots players
Philadelphia Eagles coaches
New England Patriots coaches
New Orleans Night coaches
American people of Lebanese descent
People from Moss Point, Mississippi
Carolina Cobras coaches
Nashville Kats coaches
American Football League players
Players of American football from Mississippi
Sportspeople of Lebanese descent
Philadelphia Eagles head coaches